= Gardenside, Lexington =

Neighborhood in Lexington, Kentucky

Coordinates: 38.033°N 84.547°W

Gardenside is a neighborhood in southwestern Lexington, Kentucky, United States. Its boundaries are a combination of Darien Drive, Traveler Road, Appomattox Drive, and Alexandria Drive to the west, Wolf Run Creek to the north, Beacon Hill Drive to the east, and Lane Allen Road to the south.

Neighborhood statistics

- Area: 0.268 square miles (0.69 km^{2})
- Population: 687
- Population density: 2,565 inhabitants per square mile (990/km^{2})
- Median household income: $59,311

Public school districts

- Elementary: James Lane Allen
- Middle: Beaumont
- High: Dunbar
